Orlando Pennaforte de Araujo (19 April 1905 – 25 November 1947), known as just Pennaforte, was a Brazilian footballer. He played in eight matches for the Brazil national football team from 1923 to 1925. He was also part of Brazil's squad for the 1923 South American Championship.

References

External links
 

1905 births
1947 deaths
Brazilian footballers
Brazil international footballers
Place of birth missing
Association footballers not categorized by position